Ommatissus lybicus is a species of planthoppers in the subfamily Tropiduchinae, recorded from Libya through the Middle East to Pakistan.

Pest status

Ommatissus lybicus may be known as the dubas bug or date palm hopper  and is a significant pest of date palms: with sap sucking resulting in sooty mould formation on leaves.

References

External links

Tropiduchinae
Hemiptera of Africa
Hemiptera of Asia